This is a list of the bird species recorded in Botswana. The avifauna of Botswana included a total of 614 species, as of August 2021, according to BirdLife Botswana's Checklist of Birds in Botswana, supplemented by Avibase. Of them, three have been introduced by humans. None are endemic.

This list's taxonomic treatment (designation and sequence of orders, families and species) and nomenclature (English and scientific names) are those of The Clements Checklist of Birds of the World, 2022 edition. Differences in common and scientific names between the Clements taxonomy and that of BirdLife Botswana are frequent but not noted here.

The following tags highlight several categories of occurrence other than regular migrants and residents; the tags follow the BirdLife Botswana list usage.

(A) Accidental - a species which has been recorded 10 or fewer times in Botswana 
(B) Uncommon - a species which has been recorded more than 10 times but for which BirdLife Botswana wishes to receive more records so as to better assess their status
(I) Introduced - a species introduced to Botswana as a consequence, direct or indirect, of human actions, and which has a self-sustaining population.

Ostriches
Order: StruthioniformesFamily: Struthionidae

The ostriches are flightless birds native to Africa, and are the largest living species of bird. They are distinctive in their appearance, with a long neck and legs with the ability to run at high speeds.

Common ostrich, Struthio camelus
South African ostrich, S. c. australis

Ducks, geese, and waterfowl

Order: AnseriformesFamily: Anatidae

Anatidae includes the ducks and most duck-like waterfowl, such as geese and swans. These birds are adapted to an aquatic existence with webbed feet, flattened bills, and feathers that are excellent at shedding water due to an oily coating.

White-faced whistling-duck, Dendrocygna viduata
Fulvous whistling-duck, Dendrocygna bicolor (B)
White-backed duck, Thalassornis leuconotus (B)
Knob-billed duck, Sarkidiornis melanotos
Egyptian goose, Alopochen aegyptiacus
South African shelduck, Tadorna cana
Spur-winged goose, Plectropterus gambensis
African pygmy-goose, Nettapus auritus
Garganey, Spatula querquedula (A)
Blue-billed teal, Spatula hottentota
Cape shoveler, Spatula smithii
African black duck, Anas sparsa (B)
Yellow-billed duck, Anas undulata
Cape teal, Anas capensis
Red-billed duck, Anas erythrorhyncha
Northern pintail, Anas acuta (A)
Southern pochard, Netta erythrophthalma
Maccoa duck, Oxyura maccoa (B)

Guineafowl

Order: GalliformesFamily: Numididae

Guineafowl are a group of African, seed-eating, ground-nesting birds that resemble partridges, but with featherless heads and spangled grey plumage.

Helmeted guineafowl, Numida meleagris
Western crested guineafowl, Guttera verreauxi (A)

Pheasants, grouse, and allies

Order: GalliformesFamily: Phasianidae

The Phasianidae are a family of terrestrial birds which consists of quails, partridges, snowcocks, francolins, spurfowls, tragopans, monals, pheasants, peafowls, and jungle fowls. In general, they are plump (although they vary in size) and have broad, relatively short wings.

Crested francolin, Ortygornis sephaena
Coqui francolin, Campocolinus coqui
Orange River francolin, Scleroptila gutturalis
Blue quail, Synoicus adansonii
Common quail, Coturnix coturnix (B)
Harlequin quail, Coturnix delegorguei
Red-billed francolin, Pternistis adspersus
Natal francolin, Pternistis natalensis
Swainson's francolin, Pternistis swainsonii

Flamingos

Order: PhoenicopteriformesFamily: Phoenicopteridae

Flamingos filter-feed on shellfish and algae. Their oddly shaped beaks are specially adapted to separate mud and silt from the food they consume and, uniquely, are used upside-down.

Greater flamingo, Phoenicopterus roseus
Lesser flamingo, Phoeniconaias minor (B)

Grebes

Order: PodicipediformesFamily: Podicipedidae

Grebes are small to medium-large freshwater diving birds. They have lobed toes and are excellent swimmers and divers. However, they have their feet placed far back on the body, making them quite ungainly on land.

Little grebe, Tachybaptus ruficollis
Great crested grebe, Podiceps cristatus
Eared grebe, Podiceps nigricollis (B)

Pigeons and doves
Order: ColumbiformesFamily: Columbidae

Pigeons and doves are stout-bodied birds with short necks and short slender bills with a fleshy cere.

Rock pigeon, Columba livia (I)
Speckled pigeon, Columba guinea
European turtle-dove, Streptopelia turtur (A)
Mourning collared-dove, Streptopelia decipiens
Red-eyed dove, Streptopelia semitorquata
Ring-necked dove, Streptopelia capicola
Laughing dove, Streptopelia senegalensis
Emerald-spotted wood-dove, Turtur chalcospilos
Namaqua dove, Oena capensis
African green-pigeon, Treron calva

Sandgrouse
Order: PterocliformesFamily: Pteroclidae

Sandgrouse have small pigeon-like heads and necks, but sturdy compact bodies. They have long pointed wings and sometimes tails and a fast direct flight. Flocks fly to watering holes at dawn and dusk. Their legs are feathered down to the toes.

Namaqua sandgrouse, Pterocles namaqua
Yellow-throated sandgrouse, Pterocles gutturalis
Double-banded sandgrouse, Pterocles bicinctus
Burchell's sandgrouse, Pterocles burchelli

Bustards

Order: OtidiformesFamily: Otididae

Bustards are large terrestrial birds mainly associated with dry open country and steppes in the Old World. They are omnivorous and nest on the ground. They walk steadily on strong legs and big toes, pecking for food as they go. They have long broad wings with "fingered" wingtips and striking patterns in flight. Many have interesting mating displays.

Kori bustard, Ardeotis kori (B)
Ludwig's bustard, Neotis ludwigii (A)
Denham's bustard, Neotis denhami (B)
White-bellied bustard, Eupodotis senegalensis (A)
Red-crested bustard, Eupodotis ruficrista
White-quilled Bustard, Eupodotis afraoides
Black-bellied bustard, Lissotis melanogaster

Turacos
Order: MusophagiformesFamily: Musophagidae

The turacos, plantain eaters, and go-away-birds make up the bird family Musophagidae. They are medium-sized arboreal birds. The turacos and plantain eaters are brightly coloured, usually in blue, green, or purple. The go-away birds are mostly grey and white.

Schalow's turaco, Tauraco schalowi (A)
Purple-crested turaco, Tauraco porphyreolophus (A)
Ross's turaco, Musophaga rossae (A)
Gray go-away-bird, Corythaixoides concolor

Cuckoos
Order: CuculiformesFamily: Cuculidae

The family Cuculidae includes cuckoos, roadrunners, and anis. These birds are of variable size with slender bodies, long tails, and strong legs.

Senegal coucal, Centropus senegalensis
Coppery-tailed coucal, Centropus cupreicaudus
White-browed coucal, Centropus superciliosus
Black coucal, Centropus grillii (B)
Great spotted cuckoo, Clamator glandarius
Levaillant's cuckoo, Clamator levaillantii
Pied cuckoo, Clamator jacobinus
Thick-billed cuckoo, Pachycoccyx audeberti (B)
Dideric cuckoo, Chrysococcyx caprius
Klaas's cuckoo, Chrysococcyx klaas
African emerald cuckoo, Chrysococcyx cupreus (B)  
Black cuckoo, Cuculus clamosus
Red-chested cuckoo, Cuculus solitarius
African cuckoo, Cuculus gularis
Common cuckoo, Cuculus canorus (B)

Nightjars and allies
Order: CaprimulgiformesFamily: Caprimulgidae

Nightjars are medium-sized nocturnal birds that usually nest on the ground. They have long wings, short legs, and very short bills. Most have small feet, of little use for walking, and long pointed wings. Their soft plumage is camouflaged to resemble bark or leaves.

Pennant-winged nightjar, Caprimulgus vexillarius (B)
Eurasian nightjar, Caprimulgus europaeus (A)
Rufous-cheeked nightjar, Caprimulgus rufigena
Fiery-necked nightjar, Caprimulgus pectoralis
Swamp nightjar, Caprimulgus natalensis (B)
Freckled nightjar, Caprimulgus tristigma
Square-tailed nightjar, Caprimulgus fossii

Swifts
Order: CaprimulgiformesFamily: Apodidae

Swifts are small birds which spend the majority of their lives flying. These birds have very short legs and never settle voluntarily on the ground, perching instead only on vertical surfaces. Many swifts have long swept-back wings which resemble a crescent or boomerang.

Bat-like spinetail, Neafrapus boehmi (A)
Alpine swift, Apus melba (B)
Common swift, Apus apus
African swift, Apus barbatus (B)
Bradfield's swift, Apus bradfieldi (A)
Little swift, Apus affinis
Horus swift, Apus horus (B)
White-rumped swift, Apus caffer
African palm-swift, Cypsiurus parvus

Flufftails
Order: GruiformesFamily: Sarothruridae

The flufftails are a small family of ground-dwelling birds found only in Madagascar and sub-Saharan Africa.

Buff-spotted flufftail, Sarothrura elegans (A)
Red-chested flufftail, Sarothrura rufa (B)

Rails, gallinules, and coots

Order: GruiformesFamily: Rallidae

Rallidae is a large family of small to medium-sized birds which includes the rails, crakes, coots, and gallinules. Typically they inhabit dense vegetation in damp environments near lakes, swamps, or rivers. In general they are shy and secretive birds, making them difficult to observe. Most species have strong legs and long toes which are well adapted to soft uneven surfaces. They tend to have short, rounded wings and to be weak fliers.

African rail, Rallus caerulescens (B)
Corn crake, Crex crex (A)
African crake, Crex egregia (B)
Spotted crake, Porzana porzana (B)
Lesser moorhen, Paragallinula angulata
Eurasian moorhen, Gallinula chloropus
Red-knobbed coot, Fulica cristata
Allen's gallinule, Porphyrio alleni 
African swamphen, Porphyrio madagascariensis
Striped crake, Amaurornis marginalis (B)
Black crake, Zapornia flavirostra
Baillon's crake, Zapornia pusilla (

Finfoots
Order: GruiformesFamily: Heliornithidae

Heliornithidae is a small family of tropical birds with webbed lobes on their feet similar to those of grebes and coots.

African finfoot, Podica senegalensis (B)

Cranes

Order: GruiformesFamily: Gruidae

Cranes are large, long-legged, and long-necked birds. Unlike the similar-looking but unrelated herons, cranes fly with necks outstretched, not pulled back. Most have elaborate and noisy courting displays or "dances".

Gray crowned-crane, Balearica regulorum (B)
Wattled crane, Bugeranus carunculatus (B)

Thick-knees

Order: CharadriiformesFamily: Burhinidae

The thick-knees are a group of waders found worldwide within the tropical zone, with some species also breeding in temperate Europe and Australia. They are medium to large waders with strong black or yellow-black bills, large yellow eyes, and cryptic plumage. Despite being classed as waders, most species have a preference for arid or semi-arid habitats.

Water thick-knee, Burhinus vermiculatus
Spotted thick-knee, Burhinus capensis

Stilts and avocets
Order: CharadriiformesFamily: Recurvirostridae

Recurvirostridae is a family of large wading birds, which includes the avocets and stilts. The avocets have long legs and long up-curved bills. The stilts have extremely long legs and long, thin, straight bills.

Black-winged stilt, Himantopus himantopus
Pied avocet, Recurvirostra avosetta

Plovers and lapwings

Order: CharadriiformesFamily: Charadriidae

The family Charadriidae includes the plovers, dotterels, and lapwings. They are small to medium-sized birds with compact bodies, short thick necks, and long, usually pointed, wings. They are found in open country worldwide, mostly in habitats near water.

Black-bellied plover, Pluvialis squatarola (B)
Long-toed lapwing, Vanellus crassirostris
Blacksmith lapwing, Vanellus armatus
Spur-winged lapwing, Vanellus spinosus (A)
White-headed lapwing, Vanellus albiceps (B)
Senegal lapwing, Vanellus lugubris
Crowned lapwing, Vanellus coronatus
Wattled lapwing, Vanellus senegallus
Greater sand-plover, Charadrius leschenaultii (A)
Caspian plover, Charadrius asiaticus
Kittlitz's plover, Charadrius pecuarius
Common ringed plover, Charadrius hiaticula
Three-banded plover, Charadrius tricollaris
White-fronted plover, Charadrius marginatus (B)
Chestnut-banded plover, Charadrius pallidus (B)

Painted-snipes
Order: CharadriiformesFamily: Rostratulidae

Painted-snipe are short-legged, long-billed birds similar in shape to the true snipes, but more brightly coloured.

Greater painted-snipe, Rostratula benghalensis

Jacanas

Order: CharadriiformesFamily: Jacanidae

The jacanas are a group of waders which are found throughout the tropics. They are identifiable by their huge feet and claws which enable them to walk on floating vegetation in the shallow lakes that are their preferred habitat.

Lesser jacana, Microparra capensis
African jacana, Actophilornis africanus

Sandpipers and allies

Order: CharadriiformesFamily: Scolopacidae

Scolopacidae is a large diverse family of small to medium-sized shorebirds including the sandpipers, curlews, godwits, shanks, tattlers, woodcocks, snipes, dowitchers, and phalaropes. The majority of these species eat small invertebrates picked out of the mud or soil. Variation in length of legs and bills enables multiple species to feed in the same habitat, particularly on the coast, without direct competition for food.

Whimbrel, Numenius phaeopus (B)
Eurasian curlew, Numenius arquata (B)
Bar-tailed godwit, Limosa lapponica (A)
Black-tailed godwit, Limosa limosa (B)
Ruddy turnstone, Arenaria interpres (B)
Red knot, Calidris canutus (A)
Ruff, Calidris pugnax
Curlew sandpiper, Calidris ferruginea (B)
Temminck's stint, Calidris temminckii (A)
Long-toed stint, Calidris subminuta (A)
Sanderling, Calidris alba (B)
Little stint, Calidris minuta
Buff-breasted sandpiper, Calidris subruficollis (A)
Pectoral sandpiper, Calidris melanotos (B)
Great snipe, Gallinago media (A)
African snipe, Gallinago nigripennis
Terek sandpiper, Xenus cinereus (B)
Red-necked phalarope, Phalaropus lobatus (A)
Red phalarope, Phalaropus fulicarius (A)
Common sandpiper, Actitis hypoleucos
Green sandpiper, Tringa ochropus (B)
Spotted redshank, Tringa erythropus (A)
Greater yellowlegs, Tringa melanoleuca (A)
Common greenshank, Tringa nebularia
Lesser yellowlegs, Tringa flavipes (A)
Marsh sandpiper, Tringa stagnatilis
Wood sandpiper, Tringa glareola
Common redshank, Tringa totanus (A)

Buttonquails
Order: CharadriiformesFamily: Turnicidae

The buttonquails are small, drab, running birds which resemble the true quails. The female is the brighter of the sexes and initiates courtship. The male incubates the eggs and tends the young.

Small buttonquail, Turnix sylvatica

Pratincoles and coursers

Order: CharadriiformesFamily: Glareolidae

Glareolidae is a family of wading birds comprising the pratincoles, which have short legs, long pointed wings, and long forked tails, and the coursers, which have long legs, short wings, and long, pointed bills which curve downwards.

Burchell's courser, Cursorius rufus (A)
Temminck's courser, Cursorius temminckii
Double-banded courser, Smutsornis africanus
Three-banded courser, Rhinoptilus cinctus (B)
Bronze-winged courser, Rhinoptilus chalcopterus
Collared pratincole, Glareola pratincola
Black-winged pratincole, Glareola nordmanni (B)
Rock pratincole, Glareola nuchalis (A)

Skuas and jaegers

Order: CharadriiformesFamily: Stercorariidae

The family Stercorariidae are, in general, medium to large birds, typically with grey or brown plumage, often with white markings on the wings. They nest on the ground in temperate and arctic regions and are long-distance migrants.

Long-tailed jaeger, Stercorarius longicaudus (A)

Gulls, terns, and skimmers

Order: CharadriiformesFamily: Laridae

Laridae is a family of medium to large seabirds, the gulls, terns, and skimmers. Gulls are typically grey or white, often with black markings on the head or wings. They have stout, longish bills and webbed feet. Terns are a group of generally medium to large seabirds typically with grey or white plumage, often with black markings on the head. Most terns hunt fish by diving but some pick insects off the surface of fresh water. Terns are generally long-lived birds, with several species known to live in excess of 30 years. Skimmers are a small family of tropical tern-like birds. They have an elongated lower mandible which they use to feed by flying low over the water surface and skimming the water for small fish.

Gray-hooded gull, Chroicocephalus cirrocephalus
Black-headed gull, Chroicocephalus ridibundus (A)
Lesser black-backed gull, Larus fuscus (B)
Gull-billed tern, Gelochelidon nilotica (A)
Caspian tern, Hydroprogne caspia (B)
Black tern, Chlidonias niger
White-winged tern, Chlidonias leucopterus
Whiskered tern, Chlidonias hybrida
African skimmer, Rynchops flavirostris (B)

Storks

Order: CiconiiformesFamily: Ciconiidae

Storks are large, long-legged, long-necked, wading birds with long, stout bills. Storks are mute, but bill-clattering is an important mode of communication at the nest. Their nests can be large and may be reused for many years. Many species are migratory.

African openbill, Anastomus lamelligerus
Black stork, Ciconia nigra (B)
Abdim's stork, Ciconia abdimii
African woolly-necked stork, Ciconia microscelis (B)
White stork, Ciconia ciconia
Saddle-billed stork, Ephippiorhynchus senegalensis (B)
Marabou stork, Leptoptilos crumenifer
Yellow-billed stork, Mycteria ibis

Anhingas
Order: SuliformesFamily: Anhingidae

Anhingas or darters are often called "snake-birds" because of their long thin neck, which gives a snake-like appearance when they swim with their bodies submerged. The males have black and dark-brown plumage, an erectile crest on the nape and a larger bill than the female. The females have much paler plumage especially on the neck and underparts. The darters have completely webbed feet and their legs are short and set far back on the body. Their plumage is somewhat permeable, like that of cormorants, and they spread their wings to dry after diving.

African darter, Anhinga rufa

Cormorants and shags

Order: SuliformesFamily: Phalacrocoracidae

Phalacrocoracidae is a family of medium to large coastal, fish-eating seabirds that includes cormorants and shags. Plumage colouration varies, with the majority having mainly dark plumage, some species being black-and-white, and a few being colourful.

Long-tailed cormorant, Microcarbo africanus
Great cormorant, Phalacrocorax carbo

Pelicans

Order: PelecaniformesFamily: Pelecanidae

Pelicans are large water birds with a distinctive pouch under their beak. They have webbed feet with four toes.

Great white pelican, Pelecanus onocrotalus
Pink-backed pelican, Pelecanus rufescens

Hamerkop

Order: PelecaniformesFamily: Scopidae

The hamerkop is a medium-sized bird with a long shaggy crest. The shape of its head with a curved bill and crest at the back is reminiscent of a hammer, hence its name. Its plumage is drab-brown all over.

Hamerkop, Scopus umbretta

Herons, egrets, and bitterns

Order: PelecaniformesFamily: Ardeidae

The family Ardeidae contains the bitterns, herons, and egrets. Herons and egrets are medium to large wading birds with long necks and legs. Bitterns tend to be shorter necked and more wary. Members of Ardeidae fly with their necks retracted, unlike other long-necked birds such as storks, ibises, and spoonbills.

Great bittern, Botaurus stellaris 
Little bittern, Ixobrychus minutus 
Dwarf bittern, Ixobrychus sturmii
Gray heron, Ardea cinerea
Black-headed heron, Ardea melanocephala
Goliath heron, Ardea goliath
Purple heron, Ardea purpurea
Great egret, Ardea alba
Intermediate egret, Ardea intermedia (B)
Little egret, Egretta garzetta
Slaty egret, Egretta vinaceigula (B)
Black heron, Egretta ardesiaca	
Cattle egret, Bubulcus ibis
Squacco heron, Ardeola ralloides
Rufous-bellied heron, Ardeola rufiventris
Striated heron, Butorides striata
Black-crowned night-heron, Nycticorax nycticorax
White-backed night-heron, Gorsachius leuconotus (B)

Ibises and spoonbills

Order: PelecaniformesFamily: Threskiornithidae

Threskiornithidae is a family of large terrestrial and wading birds which includes the ibises and spoonbills. They have long, broad wings with 11 primary and about 20 secondary feathers. They are strong fliers and despite their size and weight, very capable soarers.

Glossy ibis, Plegadis falcinellus
African sacred ibis, Threskiornis aethiopicus
Southern bald ibis, Geronticus calvus (A)
Hadada ibis, Bostrychia hagedash
African spoonbill, Platalea alba

Secretarybird
Order: AccipitriformesFamily: Sagittariidae

The secretarybird is a bird of prey but is easily distinguished from other raptors by its long crane-like legs.

Secretarybird, Sagittarius serpentarius (B)

Osprey

Order: AccipitriformesFamily: Pandionidae

The family Pandionidae contains only one species, the osprey. The osprey is a medium-large raptor which is a specialist fish-eater with a worldwide distribution.

Osprey, Pandion haliaetus (B)

Hawks, eagles, and kites
Order: AccipitriformesFamily: Accipitridae

Accipitridae is a family of birds of prey which includes hawks, eagles, kites, harriers, and Old World vultures. These birds have powerful hooked beaks for tearing flesh from their prey, strong legs, powerful talons, and keen eyesight.

Black-winged kite, Elanus caeruleus
African harrier-hawk, Polyboroides typus
Palm-nut vulture, Gypohierax angolensis (A)
Egyptian vulture, Neophron percnopterus (A)
European honey-buzzard, Pernis apivorus (B)
African cuckoo-hawk, Aviceda cuculoides (A)
White-headed vulture, Trigonoceps occipitalis (B)
Lappet-faced vulture, Torgos tracheliotos (B)
Hooded vulture, Necrosyrtes monachus (B)
White-backed vulture, Gyps africanus (B)
Cape griffon, Gyps coprotheres (B)
Bateleur, Terathopius ecaudatus (B)
Black-chested snake-eagle, Circaetus pectoralis
Brown snake-eagle, Circaetus cinereus
Banded snake-eagle, Circaetus cinerascens
Bat hawk, Macheiramphus alcinus (B)
Crowned eagle, Stephanoaetus coronatus (A)
Martial eagle, Polemaetus bellicosus (B)
Long-crested eagle, Lophaetus occipitalis (B)
Lesser spotted eagle, Clanga pomarina (B)
Wahlberg's eagle, Hieraaetus wahlbergi
Booted eagle, Hieraaetus pennatus (B)
Ayres's hawk-eagle, Hieraaetus ayresii (B)
Tawny eagle, Aquila rapax
Steppe eagle, Aquila nipalensis (B)
Verreaux's eagle, Aquila verreauxii
African hawk-eagle, Aquila spilogaster
Lizard buzzard, Kaupifalco monogrammicus (B)
Dark chanting-goshawk, Melierax metabates
Pale chanting-goshawk, Melierax canorus
Gabar goshawk, Micronisus gabar
Eurasian marsh-harrier, Circus aeruginosus (B)
African marsh-harrier, Circus ranivorus (B)
Black harrier, Circus maurus (A)
Pallid harrier, Circus macrourus (B)
Montagu's harrier, Circus pygargus
African goshawk, Accipiter tachiro (A)
Shikra, Accipiter badius
Little sparrowhawk, Accipiter minullus
Ovambo sparrowhawk, Accipiter ovampensis
Black goshawk, Accipiter melanoleucus (B)
Black kite, Milvus migrans
African fish-eagle, Haliaeetus vocifer
Common buzzard, Buteo buteo
Long-legged buzzard, Buteo rufinus (A)
Red-necked buzzard, Buteo auguralis (A)
Augur buzzard, Buteo augur (A)
Jackal buzzard, Buteo rufofuscus (B)

Barn-owls
Order: StrigiformesFamily: Tytonidae

Barn-owls are medium to large owls with large heads and characteristic heart-shaped faces. They have long strong legs with powerful talons.

African grass-owl, Tyto capensis (A)
Barn owl, Tyto alba

Owls

Order: StrigiformesFamily: Strigidae

The typical owls are small to large solitary nocturnal birds of prey. They have large forward-facing eyes and ears, a hawk-like beak, and a conspicuous circle of feathers around each eye called a facial disk.

Eurasian scops-owl, Otus scops
African scops-owl, Otus senegalensis
Southern white-faced owl, Ptilopsis granti
Spotted eagle-owl, Bubo africanus
Verreaux's eagle-owl, Bubo lacteus
Pel's fishing-owl, Scotopelia peli
Pearl-spotted owlet, Glaucidium perlatum
African barred owlet, Glaucidium capense
African wood-owl, Strix woodfordii
Marsh owl, Asio capensis

Mousebirds

Order: ColiiformesFamily: Coliidae

The mousebirds are slender greyish or brown birds with soft, hairlike body feathers and very long thin tails. They are arboreal and scurry through the leaves like rodents in search of berries, fruit, and buds. They are acrobatic and can feed upside down. All species have strong claws and reversible outer toes. They also have crests and stubby bills.

Speckled mousebird, Colius striatus
White-backed mousebird, Colius colius
Red-faced mousebird, Urocolius indicus

Trogons
Order: TrogoniformesFamily: Trogonidae

The family Trogonidae includes trogons and quetzals. Found in tropical woodlands worldwide, they feed on insects and fruit, and their broad bills and weak legs reflect their diet and arboreal habits. Although their flight is fast, they are reluctant to fly any distance. Trogons have soft, often colourful, feathers with distinctive male and female plumage.

Narina trogon, Apaloderma narina (B)

Hoopoes
Order: BucerotiformesFamily: Upupidae

Hoopoes have black, white, and orangey-pink colouring with a large erectile crest on their head.

Eurasian hoopoe, Upupa epops

Woodhoopoes and scimitarbills
Order: BucerotiformesFamily: Phoeniculidae

The woodhoopoes and scimitarbills are related to the hoopoes, ground-hornbills, and hornbills. They most resemble the hoopoes with their long curved bills, used to probe for insects, and short rounded wings. However, they differ in that they have metallic plumage, often blue, green, or purple, and lack an erectile crest.

Green woodhoopoe, Phoeniculus purpureus
Common scimitarbill, Rhinopomastus cyanomelas

Ground-hornbills
Order: BucerotiformesFamily: Bucorvidae

The ground-hornbills are terrestrial birds which feed almost entirely on insects, other birds, snakes, and amphibians.

Southern ground-hornbill, Bucorvus leadbeateri (B)

Hornbills
Order: BucerotiformesFamily: Bucerotidae

Hornbills are a group of birds whose bill is shaped like a cow's horn, but without a twist, sometimes with a casque on the upper mandible. Frequently, the bill is brightly coloured.

Crowned hornbill, Lophoceros alboterminatus (A)
Bradfield's hornbill, Lophoceros bradfieldi
African gray hornbill, Lophoceros nasutus
Southern yellow-billed hornbill, Tockus leucomelas
Southern red-billed hornbill, Tockus rufirostris
Trumpeter hornbill, Bycanistes bucinator

Kingfishers
Order: CoraciiformesFamily: Alcedinidae

Kingfishers are medium-sized birds with large heads, long pointed bills, short legs, and stubby tails.

Half-collared kingfisher, Alcedo semitorquata (A)
Malachite kingfisher, Corythornis cristatus
African pygmy kingfisher, Ispidina picta (B)
Gray-headed kingfisher, Halcyon leucocephala (B)
Woodland kingfisher, Halcyon senegalensis
Brown-hooded kingfisher, Halcyon albiventris 
Striped kingfisher, Halcyon chelicuti
Giant kingfisher, Megaceryle maximus
Pied kingfisher, Ceryle rudis

Bee-eaters
Order: CoraciiformesFamily: Meropidae

The bee-eaters are a group of near passerine birds; most species are found in Africa but others occur in southern Europe, Madagascar, Australia, and New Guinea. They are characterised by richly coloured plumage, slender bodies, and usually elongated central tail feathers. All are colourful and have long downturned bills and pointed wings, which give them a swallow-like appearance when seen from afar.

White-fronted bee-eater, Merops bullockoides
Little bee-eater, Merops pusillus
Swallow-tailed bee-eater, Merops hirundineus
Blue-cheeked bee-eater, Merops persicus
Madagascar bee-eater, Merops superciliosus (A)
European bee-eater, Merops apiaster
Southern carmine bee-eater, Merops nubicoides

Rollers

Order: CoraciiformesFamily: Coraciidae

Rollers resemble crows in size and build, but are more closely related to the kingfishers and bee-eaters. They share the colourful appearance of those groups with blues and browns predominating. The two inner front toes are connected, but the outer toe is not.

European roller, Coracias garrulus (B)
Lilac-breasted roller, Coracias caudata
Racket-tailed roller, Coracias spatulata (B)
Rufous-crowned roller, Coracias naevia
Broad-billed roller, Eurystomus glaucurus

African barbets

Order: PiciformesFamily: Lybiidae

The African barbets are plump birds with short necks and large heads. They get their name from the bristles which fringe their heavy bills. Most species are brightly coloured.

Crested barbet, Trachyphonus vaillantii
Yellow-fronted tinkerbird, Pogoniulus chrysoconus
Pied barbet, Tricholaema leucomelas
Black-collared barbet, Lybius torquatus

Honeyguides
Order: PiciformesFamily: Indicatoridae

Honeyguides are among the few birds that feed on wax. They are named for the greater honeyguide which leads traditional honey-hunters to bees' nests and, after the hunters have harvested the honey, feeds on the remaining contents of the hive.

Green-backed honeyguide, Prodotiscus zambesiae (A)
Wahlberg's honeyguide, Prodotiscus regulus (B)
Lesser honeyguide, Indicator minor
Greater honeyguide, Indicator indicator

Woodpeckers
Order: PiciformesFamily: Picidae

Woodpeckers are small to medium-sized birds with chisel-like beaks, short legs, stiff tails, and long tongues used for capturing insects. Some species have feet with two toes pointing forward and two backward, while several species have only three toes. Many woodpeckers have the habit of tapping noisily on tree trunks with their beaks.

Cardinal woodpecker, Chloropicus fuscescens
Bearded woodpecker, Chloropicus namaquus
Olive woodpecker, Chloropicus griseocephalus (A)
Bennett's woodpecker, Campethera bennettii
Golden-tailed woodpecker, Campethera abingoni

Falcons and caracaras

Order: FalconiformesFamily: Falconidae

Falconidae is a family of diurnal birds of prey. They differ from hawks, eagles, and kites in that they kill with their beaks instead of their talons.

Pygmy falcon, Polihierax semitorquatus
Lesser kestrel, Falco naumanni (B)
Eurasian kestrel, Falco tinnunculus
Rock kestrel, Falco rupicolus
Greater kestrel, Falco rupicoloides
Dickinson's kestrel, Falco dickinsoni
Red-necked falcon, Falco chicquera
Red-footed falcon, Falco vespertinus (B)
Amur falcon, Falco amurensis (B)
Eleonora's falcon, Falco eleonorae (A)
Sooty falcon, Falco concolor (A)
Eurasian hobby, Falco subbuteo (B)
African hobby, Falco cuvierii (B)
Lanner falcon, Falco biarmicus
Peregrine falcon, Falco peregrinus (B)

Old World parrots
Order: PsittaciformesFamily: Psittaculidae.

Characteristic features of parrots include a strong curved bill, an upright stance, strong legs, and clawed zygodactyl feet. Many parrots are vividly colored, and some are multi-colored. Old World parrots are found from Africa east across south and southeast Asia and Oceania to Australia and New Zealand.

Rosy-faced lovebird, Agapornis roseicollis (A)

African and New World parrots
Order: PsittaciformesFamily: Psittacidae.

Characteristic features of parrots include a strong curved bill, an upright stance, strong legs, and clawed zygodactyl feet. Many parrots are vividly coloured, and some are multi-coloured. Most of the more than 150 species in this family are found in the New World.

Brown-necked parrot, Poicephalus fuscicollis (A)
Meyer's parrot, Poicephalus meyeri

African and green broadbills
Order: PasseriformesFamily: Calyptomenidae

The broadbills are small, brightly coloured birds which feed on fruit and also take insects in flycatcher fashion, snapping their broad bills. Their habitat is canopies of wet forests.

African broadbill, Smithornis capensis

Cuckooshrikes
Order: PasseriformesFamily: Campephagidae

The cuckooshrikes are small to medium-sized passerine birds. They are predominantly greyish with white and black, although some species are brightly coloured.

White-breasted cuckooshrike, Coracina pectoralis
Black cuckooshrike, Campephaga flava

Old World orioles
Order: PasseriformesFamily: Oriolidae

The Old World orioles are colourful passerine birds which are not related to the similar-appearing New World orioles.

Eurasian golden oriole, Oriolus oriolus
African golden oriole, Oriolus auratus
African black-headed oriole, Oriolus larvatus

Wattle-eyes and batises
Order: PasseriformesFamily: Platysteiridae

The wattle-eyes, or puffback flycatchers, are small stout passerine birds of the African tropics. They get their name from the brightly coloured fleshy eye decorations found in most species in this group.

Cape batis, Batis capensis (A)
Chinspot batis, Batis molitor
Pririt batis, Batis pririt

Vangas, helmetshrikes, and allies
Order: PasseriformesFamily: Vangidae

The helmetshrikes are similar in build to the shrikes, but tend to be colourful species with distinctive crests or other head ornaments, such as wattles, from which they get their name.

White helmetshrike, Prionops plumatus
Retz's helmetshrike, Prionops retzii

Bushshrikes and allies

Order: PasseriformesFamily: Malaconotidae

Bushshrikes are similar in habits to shrikes, hunting insects and other small prey from a perch on a bush. Although similar in build to the shrikes, these tend to be either colourful species or largely black; some species are quite secretive.

Brubru, Nilaus afer
Black-backed puffback, Dryoscopus cubla
Black-crowned tchagra, Tchagra senegala
Brown-crowned tchagra, Tchagra australis
Tropical boubou, Laniarius major
Gabon boubou, Laniarius bicolor
Southern boubou, Laniarius ferrugineus
Crimson-breasted gonolek, Laniarius atrococcineus
Bokmakierie, Telophorus zeylonus (B)
Sulphur-breasted bushshrike, Telophorus sulfureopectus
Gray-headed bushshrike, Malaconotus blanchoti

Drongos
Order: PasseriformesFamily: Dicruridae

The drongos are mostly black or dark grey in colour, sometimes with metallic tints. They have long forked tails, and some Asian species have elaborate tail decorations. They have short legs and sit very upright when perched, like a shrike. They flycatch or take prey from the ground.

Fork-tailed drongo, Dicrurus adsimilis

Monarch flycatchers

Order: PasseriformesFamily: Monarchidae

The monarch flycatchers are small to medium-sized insectivorous passerines which hunt by flycatching.

African paradise-flycatcher, Terpsiphone viridis

Shrikes
Order: PasseriformesFamily: Laniidae

Shrikes are passerine birds known for their habit of catching other birds and small animals and impaling the uneaten portions of their bodies on thorns. A shrike's beak is hooked, like that of a typical bird of prey.

Red-backed shrike, Lanius collurio
Isabelline shrike, Lanius isabellinus (A)
Lesser gray shrike, Lanius minor
Magpie shrike, Lanius melanoleucus
Northern fiscal, Lanius humeralis
Southern fiscal, Lanius collaris
Souza's shrike, Lanius souzae (A)
White-crowned shrike, Eurocephalus anguitimens

Crows, jays, and magpies
Order: PasseriformesFamily: Corvidae

The family Corvidae includes crows, ravens, jays, choughs, magpies, treepies, nutcrackers, and ground jays. Corvids are above average in size among the Passeriformes, and some of the larger species show high levels of intelligence.

Cape crow, Corvus capensis
Pied crow, Corvus albus
White-necked raven, Corvus albicollis (A)

Fairy flycatchers
Order: PasseriformesFamily: Stenostiridae

Most of the species of this small family are found in Africa, though a few inhabit tropical Asia. They are not closely related to other birds called "flycatchers".

Fairy flycatcher, Stenostira scita (B)

Tits, chickadees, and titmice
Order: PasseriformesFamily: Paridae

The Paridae are mainly small stocky woodland species with short stout bills. Some have crests. They are adaptable birds, with a mixed diet including seeds and insects.

Rufous-bellied tit, Melaniparus rufiventris 
Southern black-tit, Melaniparus niger
Ashy tit, Melaniparus cinerascens

Penduline-tits
Order: PasseriformesFamily: Remizidae

The penduline-tits are a group of small passerine birds related to the true tits. They are insectivores.

African penduline-tit, Anthoscopus caroli
Southern penduline-tit, Anthoscopus minutus

Larks

Order: PasseriformesFamily: Alaudidae

Larks are small terrestrial birds with often extravagant songs and display flights. Most larks are fairly dull in appearance. Their food is insects and seeds.

Spike-heeled lark, Chersomanes albofasciata
Short-clawed lark, Certhilauda chuana
Dusky lark, Pinarocorys nigricans
Black-eared sparrow-lark, Eremopterix australis (A)
Chestnut-backed sparrow-lark, Eremopterix leucotis
Gray-backed sparrow-lark, Eremopterix verticalis
Sabota lark, Calendulauda sabota
Fawn-colored lark, Calendulauda africanoides
Red lark, Calendulauda burra
Eastern clapper lark, Mirafra fasciolata
Rufous-naped lark, Mirafra africana
Flappet lark, Mirafra rufocinnamomea
Monotonous lark, Mirafra passerina
Latakoo lark, Mirafra cheniana (A)
Red-capped lark, Calandrella cinerea
Stark's lark, Spizocorys starki (B)
Pink-billed lark, Spizocorys conirostris

Nicators
Order: PasseriformesFamily: Nicatoridae

The nicators are shrike-like, with hooked bills. They are endemic to sub-Saharan Africa.

Eastern nicator, Nicator gularis (A)

African warblers
Order: PasseriformesFamily: Macrosphenidae

The African warblers are small to medium-sized insectivores which are found in a wide variety of habitats south of the Sahara.

Cape crombec, Sylvietta rufescens

Cisticolas and allies

Order: PasseriformesFamily: Cisticolidae

The Cisticolidae are warblers found mainly in warmer southern regions of the Old World. They are generally very small birds of drab brown or grey appearance found in open country such as grassland or scrub.

Yellow-bellied eremomela, Eremomela icteropygialis
Greencap eremomela, Eremomela scotops
Burnt-necked eremomela, Eremomela usticollis
Miombo wren-warbler, Calamonastes undosus
Stierling's wren-warbler, Calamonastes stierlingi
Barred wren-warbler, Calamonastes fasciolatus
Green-backed camaroptera, Camaroptera brachyura
Bar-throated apalis, Apalis thoracica
Yellow-breasted apalis, Apalis flavida
Tawny-flanked prinia, Prinia subflava
Black-chested prinia, Prinia flavicans
Rufous-eared warbler, Malcorus pectoralis
Red-faced cisticola, Cisticola erythrops
Rock-loving cisticola, Cisticola aberrans
Rattling cisticola, Cisticola chiniana
Tinkling cisticola, Cisticola rufilatus
Luapula cisticola, Cisticola luapula
Chirping cisticola, Cisticola pipiens
Rufous-winged cisticola, Cisticola galactotes
Levaillant's cisticola, Cisticola tinniens 
Croaking cisticola, Cisticola natalensis 
Piping cisticola, Cisticola fulvicapilla
Zitting cisticola, Cisticola juncidis
Desert cisticola, Cisticola aridulus
Cloud cisticola, Cisticola textrix (A)
Pale-crowned cisticola, Cisticola cinnamomeus (A)

Reed warblers and allies
Order: PasseriformesFamily: Acrocephalidae

The members of this family are usually rather large for "warblers". Most are rather plain olivaceous brown above with much yellow to beige below. They are usually found in open woodland, reedbeds, or tall grass. The family occurs mostly in southern to western Eurasia and surroundings, but it also ranges far into the Pacific, with some species in  Africa.

African yellow-warbler, Iduna natalensis (A)
Olive-tree warbler, Hippolais olivetorum (B)
Icterine warbler, Hippolais icterina
Sedge warbler, Acrocephalus schoenobaenus
Marsh warbler, Acrocephalus palustris
Common reed warbler, Acrocephalus scirpaceus 
Basra reed warbler, Acrocephalus griseldis (A)
Lesser swamp warbler, Acrocephalus gracilirostris
Greater swamp warbler, Acrocephalus rufescens
Great reed warbler, Acrocephalus arundinaceus

Grassbirds and allies
Order: PasseriformesFamily: Locustellidae

Locustellidae are a family of small insectivorous songbirds found mainly in Eurasia, Africa, and the Australian region. They are smallish birds with tails that are usually long and pointed, and tend to be drab brownish or buffy all over.

River warbler, Locustella fluviatilis (B)
Little rush warbler, Bradypterus baboecala

Swallows
Order: PasseriformesFamily: Hirundinidae

The family Hirundinidae is adapted to aerial feeding. They have a slender streamlined body, long pointed wings, and a short bill with a wide gape. The feet are adapted to perching rather than walking, and the front toes are partially joined at the base.

Plain martin, Riparia paludicola (B)
Bank swallow, Riparia riparia
Banded martin, Neophedina cincta
Rock martin, Ptyonoprogne fuligula
Barn swallow, Hirundo rustica
Red-chested swallow, Hirundo lucida (A)
Angola swallow, Hirundo angolensis (A)
White-throated swallow, Hirundo albigularis
Wire-tailed swallow, Hirundo smithii
Pearl-breasted swallow, Hirundo dimidiata (B)
Greater striped swallow, Cecropis cucullata
Lesser striped swallow, Cecropis abyssinica
Rufous-chested swallow, Cecropis semirufa
Mosque swallow, Cecropis senegalensis (B)
South African swallow, Petrochelidon spilodera (B)
Common house-martin, Delichon urbicum
Black sawwing, Psalidoprocne pristoptera (A)
Gray-rumped swallow, Pseudhirundo griseopyga

Bulbuls
Order: PasseriformesFamily: Pycnonotidae

Bulbuls are medium-sized songbirds. Some are colourful with yellow, red, or orange vents, cheeks, throats, or supercilia, but most are drab, with uniform olive-brown to black plumage. Some species have distinct crests.

Yellow-bellied greenbul, Chlorocichla flaviventris
Terrestrial brownbul, Phyllastrephus terrestris
Common bulbul, Pycnonotus barbatus
Black-fronted bulbul, Pycnonotus nigricans

Leaf warblers
Order: PasseriformesFamily: Phylloscopidae

Leaf warblers are a family of small insectivorous birds found mostly in Eurasia and ranging into Wallacea and Africa. The species are of various sizes, often green-plumaged above and yellow below, or more subdued with greyish-green to greyish-brown colours.

Willow warbler, Phylloscopus trochilus

Sylviid warblers, Parrotbills, and allies
Order: PasseriformesFamily: Sylviidae

The family Sylviidae  ("Old World warblers") is a group of small insectivorous passerine birds. They mainly occur as breeding species, as the common name implies, in Europe, Asia and, to a lesser extent, Africa. Most are of generally undistinguished appearance, but many have distinctive songs.

Eurasian blackcap, Sylvia atricapilla (A)
Garden warbler, Sylvia borin (B)
Barred warbler, Curruca nisoria 
Chestnut-vented warbler, Curruca subcoerulea
Greater whitethroat, Curruca communis

White-eyes, yuhinas, and allies
Order: PasseriformesFamily: Zosteropidae

The white-eyes are small and mostly undistinguished, their plumage above being generally some dull colour like greenish-olive, but some species have a white or bright yellow throat, breast or lower parts, and several have buff flanks. As their name suggests, many species have a white ring around each eye.

Orange River white-eye, Zosterops pallidus
Cape white-eye, Zosterops virens
Southern yellow white-eye, Zosterops anderssoni

Laughingthrushes and allies
Order: PasseriformesFamily: Leiothrichidae

The members of this family are diverse in size and colouration, though those of genus Turdoides tend to be brown or greyish. The family is found in Africa, India, and southeast Asia.

Arrow-marked babbler, Turdoides jardineii
Southern pied-babbler, Turdoides bicolor
Hartlaub's babbler, Turdoides hartlaubii
Black-faced babbler, Turdoides melanops

Treecreepers
Order: PasseriformesFamily: Certhiidae

Treecreepers are small woodland birds, brown above and white below. They have thin pointed down-curved bills, which they use to extricate insects from bark. They have stiff tail feathers, like woodpeckers, which they use to support themselves on vertical trees.

African spotted creeper, Salpornis salvadori (A)

Oxpeckers
Order: PasseriformesFamily: Buphagidae

As both the English and scientific names of these birds imply, they feed on ectoparasites, primarily ticks, found on large mammals.

Red-billed oxpecker, Buphagus erythrorynchus
Yellow-billed oxpecker, Buphagus africanus

Starlings

Order: PasseriformesFamily: Sturnidae

Starlings are small to medium-sized passerine birds. Their flight is strong and direct and they are very gregarious. Their preferred habitat is fairly open country. They eat insects and fruit. Plumage is typically dark with a metallic sheen.

European starling, Sturnus vulgaris (A)
Wattled starling, Creatophora cinerea
Common myna, Acridotheres tristis (I)
Violet-backed starling, Cinnyricinclus leucogaster
Pale-winged starling, Onychognathus nabouroup (A)
Red-winged starling, Onychognathus morio
Burchell's starling, Lamprotornis australis
Meves's starling, Lamprotornis mevesii
Lesser blue-eared starling, Lamprotornis chloropterus (A)
Sharp-tailed starling, Lamprotornis acuticaudus (B)
Greater blue-eared starling, Lamprotornis chalybaeus
Cape starling, Lamprotornis nitens

Thrushes and allies
Order: PasseriformesFamily: Turdidae

The thrushes are a group of passerine birds that occur mainly in the Old World. They are plump, soft plumaged, small to medium-sized insectivores or sometimes omnivores, often feeding on the ground. Many have attractive songs.

Groundscraper thrush, Turdus litsitsirupa
Kurrichane thrush, Turdus libonyana
Olive thrush, Turdus olivaceus
Karoo thrush, Turdus smithi

Old World flycatchers

Order: PasseriformesFamily: Muscicapidae

Old World flycatchers are a large group of small passerine birds native to the Old World. They are mainly small arboreal insectivores. The appearance of these birds is highly varied, but they mostly have weak songs and harsh calls.

Spotted flycatcher, Muscicapa striata
Mariqua flycatcher, Bradornis mariquensis
Pale flycatcher, Agricola pallidus
Chat flycatcher, Agricola infuscatus
Gray tit-flycatcher, Fraseria plumbea
Ashy flycatcher, Fraseria caerulescens
Fiscal flycatcher, Melaenornis silens
Southern black-flycatcher, Melaenornis pammelaina
Bearded scrub-robin, Cercotrichas quadrivirgata (B)
Kalahari scrub-robin, Cercotrichas paena
Red-backed scrub-robin, Cercotrichas leucophrys
Cape robin-chat, Cossypha caffra (A)
White-throated robin-chat, Cossypha humeralis
White-browed robin-chat, Cossypha heuglini
Red-capped robin-chat, Cossypha natalensis (A)
Collared palm-thrush, Cichladusa arquata (A)
Thrush nightingale, Luscinia luscinia (B)
Short-toed rock-thrush, Monticola brevipes
Miombo rock-thrush, Monticola angolensis 
Cape rock-thrush, Monticola rupestris (A)
Whinchat, Saxicola rubetra (A)
African stonechat, Saxicola torquatus
Sickle-winged chat, Emarginata sinuata (A)
Mocking cliff-chat, Thamnolaea cinnamomeiventris
Southern anteater-chat, Myrmecocichla formicivora
Mountain wheatear, Myrmecocichla monticola (A)
Arnot's chat, Myrmecocichla arnotti
Northern wheatear, Oenanthe oenanthe (A)
Capped wheatear, Oenanthe pileata
Isabelline wheatear, Oenanthe isabellina (A)
Pied wheatear, Oenanthe pleschanka (A)
Familiar chat, Oenanthe familiaris
Boulder chat, Pinarornis plumosus

Sunbirds and spiderhunters

Order: PasseriformesFamily: Nectariniidae

The sunbirds and spiderhunters are very small passerine birds which feed largely on nectar, although they will also take insects, especially when feeding young. Flight is fast and direct on their short wings. Most species can take nectar by hovering like a hummingbird, but usually perch to feed.

Collared sunbird, Hedydipna collaris
Amethyst sunbird, Chalcomitra amethystina
Scarlet-chested sunbird, Chalcomitra senegalensis
Mariqua sunbird, Cinnyris mariquensis
Purple-banded sunbird, Cinnyris bifasciatus (B)
White-breasted sunbird, Cinnyris talatala
Dusky sunbird, Cinnyris fuscus (B)
Copper sunbird, Cinnyris cupreus (A)

Weavers and allies
Order: PasseriformesFamily: Ploceidae

The weavers are small passerine birds related to the finches. They are seed-eating birds with rounded conical bills. The males of many species are brightly coloured, usually in red or yellow and black, and some species show variation in colour only in the breeding season.

Red-billed buffalo-weaver, Bubalornis niger
Scaly weaver, Sporopipes squamifrons
White-browed sparrow-weaver, Plocepasser mahali
Sociable weaver, Philetairus socius
Red-headed weaver, Anaplectes rubriceps
Spectacled weaver, Ploceus ocularis
Holub's golden-weaver, Ploceus xanthops
Southern brown-throated weaver, Ploceus xanthopterus
Lesser masked-weaver, Ploceus intermedius
Southern masked-weaver, Ploceus velatus
Village weaver, Ploceus cucullatus (B)
Chestnut weaver, Ploceus rubiginosus (B)
Red-headed quelea, Quelea erythrops (A)
Red-billed quelea, Quelea quelea
Southern red bishop, Euplectes orix
Yellow-crowned bishop, Euplectes afer
White-winged widowbird, Euplectes albonotatus
Red-collared widowbird, Euplectes ardens (A)
Fan-tailed widowbird, Euplectes axillaris
Long-tailed widowbird, Euplectes progne
Grosbeak weaver, Amblyospiza albifrons

Waxbills and allies

Order: PasseriformesFamily: Estrildidae

The estrildid finches are small passerine birds of the Old World tropics and Australasia. They are gregarious and often colonial seed eaters with short thick but pointed bills. They are all similar in structure and habits, but have wide variation in plumage colours and patterns.

Bronze mannikin, Spermestes cucullata
Magpie mannikin, Spermestes fringilloides (A)
Black-faced waxbill, Brunhilda erythronotos
Common waxbill, Estrilda astrild
Quailfinch, Ortygospiza fuscocrissa
Locust finch, Paludipasser locustella (A)
Cut-throat, Amadina fasciata
Red-headed finch, Amadina erythrocephala
Zebra waxbill, Amandava subflava (B)
Violet-eared waxbill, Uraeginthus granatina
Southern cordonbleu, Uraeginthus angolensis
Green-winged pytilia, Pytilia melba
Orange-winged pytilia, Pytilia afra (B)
Peters's twinspot, Hypargos niveoguttatus (A)
Red-billed firefinch, Lagonosticta senegala
Jameson's firefinch, Lagonosticta rhodopareia
Brown firefinch, Lagonosticta nitidula

Indigobirds
Order: PasseriformesFamily: Viduidae

The indigobirds are finch-like species which usually have black or indigo predominating in their plumage. All are brood parasites, which lay their eggs in the nests of estrildid finches.

Pin-tailed whydah, Vidua macroura
Broad-tailed paradise-whydah, Vidua obtusa (B)
Eastern paradise-whydah, Vidua paradisaea
Shaft-tailed whydah, Vidua regia
Village indigobird, Vidua chalybeata
Purple indigobird, Vidua purpurascens
Parasitic weaver, Anomalospiza imberbis (B)

Old World sparrows
Order: PasseriformesFamily: Passeridae

Sparrows are small passerine birds. In general, sparrows tend to be small, plump, brown or grey birds with short tails and short powerful beaks. Sparrows are seed eaters, but they also consume small insects.

House sparrow, Passer domesticus (I)
Great rufous sparrow, Passer motitensis
Cape sparrow, Passer melanurus
Northern gray-headed sparrow, Passer griseus (A)
Southern gray-headed sparrow, Passer diffusus
Yellow-throated bush sparrow, Gymnoris superciliaris

Wagtails and pipits

Order: PasseriformesFamily: Motacillidae

Motacillidae is a family of small passerine birds with medium to long tails. They include the wagtails, longclaws, and pipits. They are slender ground-feeding insectivores of open country.

Cape wagtail, Motacilla capensis
Mountain wagtail, Motacilla clara (A)
Gray wagtail, Motacilla cinerea (A)
Western yellow wagtail, Motacilla flava
African pied wagtail, Motacilla aguimp
African pipit, Anthus cinnamomeus
Mountain pipit, Anthus hoeschi 
Woodland pipit, Anthus nyassae (A)
Nicholson's pipit, Anthus nicholsoni (B)
Plain-backed pipit, Anthus leucophrys
Buffy pipit, Anthus vaalensis
Striped pipit, Anthus lineiventris (B)
Tree pipit, Anthus trivialis 
Red-throated pipit, Anthus cervinus (A)
Bush pipit, Anthus caffer (B)
Orange-throated longclaw, Macronyx capensis (B)
Rosy-throated longclaw, Macronyx ameliae

Finches, euphonias, and allies

Order: PasseriformesFamily: Fringillidae

Finches are seed-eating passerine birds that are small to moderately large and have a strong beak, usually conical and in some species very large. All have twelve tail feathers and nine primaries. These birds have a bouncing flight with alternating bouts of flapping and gliding on closed wings, and most sing well.

Yellow-fronted canary, Crithagra mozambica
Black-throated canary, Crithagra atrogularis
Yellow canary, Crithagra flaviventris
Black-eared seedeater, Crithagra mennelli (A)
Streaky-headed seedeater, Crithagra gularis (B)
Cape canary, Serinus canicollis 
Black-headed canary, Serinus alario (A)

Old World buntings
Order: PasseriformesFamily: Emberizidae

The emberizids are a large family of passerine birds. They are seed-eating birds with distinctively shaped bills. Many emberizid species have distinctive head patterns.

Golden-breasted bunting, Emberiza flaviventris
Cape bunting, Emberiza capensis (A)
Lark-like bunting, Emberiza impetuani
Cinnamon-breasted bunting, Emberiza tahapisi

See also
Wildlife of Botswana
List of birds
Lists of birds by region

References

External links
Birds of Botswana - World Institute for Conservation and Environment

Botswana
'Botswana
Botswana
birds